Deanna Michelle D'Alessandro is an Australian chemist who is a Professor and Australian Research Council Future Fellow at the University of Sydney. Her research considers fundamental aspects of electron transfer in molecular coordination complexes and in nanoporous materials, and the development of metal–organic frameworks for environmental applications including carbon dioxide capture and conversion.

Early life and education 
D'Alessandro completed her Bachelor of Science degree and PhD at James Cook University. During her graduate studies, she studied the impact of stereochemistry on electron transfer with Emeritus Professor Richard Keene. Her PhD (conferred in 2006) titled “Stereochemical Effects on Intervalence Charge Transfer” has been the subject of a number of international publications and awards including a JCU Medal of Excellence for a Doctoral Research Thesis, the 2006 Cornforth Medal of the Royal Australian Chemical Institute, and a 2007 IUPAC Prize for Young Chemists, one of 5 awarded internationally. She subsequently moved to a postdoctoral position at the University of Sydney in 2007, where she worked on artificial photosynthesis for developing molecular electronics devices, presenting this research in schools and to public audiences as part of 'Fresh Science'. D'Alessandro became qualified as a JP(Qld) in 2003.

Research and career 
In 2007, D'Alessandro joined Professor Jeff Long's group at the University of California, Berkeley where she was supported by the DOW Chemical Company's American-Australian Association Fellowship and a Royal Commission for the Exhibition of 1851 Fellowship. Here she began work in metal–organic frameworks for environmental applications including carbon dioxide capture. An important advance was the first successful design and synthesis of air and water stable alkylamine-based MOFs for postcombustion carbon capture which is the subject of an international patent in addition to a number of critical reviews.

D'Alessandro returned to Australia as a University of Sydney Postdoctoral Fellow in 2010. She was made a L'Oréal-UNESCO For Women in Science Fellow at the University of Sydney in the same year, and in 2011 received an Australian Research Council QEII Fellowship which allowed her to start building her own research group. Her research considers the design and development of novel inorganic materials called metal-organic frameworks (MOFs) for multifunctional electronic, optical and magnetic devices.

She has worked to develop materials that can adsorb and transform carbon dioxide. These MOFs are porous materials with very high surface areas which are also lightweight, low cost and potentially conductive. They behave like a sponge, and can capture and separate gases such as methane, nitrogen, hydrogen and carbon dioxide, amongst others.

Awards and honours 

 2018-2022     Australian Research Council Future Fellow
2017             Fellow, RACI
2017             Australian Academy of Science Le Fèvre Medal. In recognition of outstanding basic research in chemistry by researchers up to 10 years post-PhD for research conducted mainly in Australia
2017             RACI (Inorganic division) Alan Sargeson Lectureship. To recognise significant and innovative individual contributions to the field by researchers within 10 years of the award of their PhD
2017-2018        Sydney Research Accelerator (SOAR) Fellow
2015             Royal Society of Chemistry (RSC) ChemComm Emerging Investigator Lectureship. One of two awarded internationally to recognise an emerging scientist in the early stages of their independent academic career
2014             Royal Australian Chemical Institute (RACI) Rennie Medal. For a researcher with less than 10 years of professional experience for research that has contributed most towards the development of a branch of chemical science
2012             Chemical Society of Japan Distinguished Lectureship Award
2011-2016        Australian Research Council QEII Fellow
2011             Australian Institute of Political Science NSW Young Tall Poppy Science Award
2010             L'Oreal Australia for Women in Science Fellow. See the You Tube presentation here
2010             James Cook University Outstanding Early Career Alumni Award. One of five awarded for the past 10 years during the 40th Anniversary celebrations
2007-2009        Royal Commission for the Exhibition of 1851 Research Fellowship. One of 6 awarded across Commonwealth countries 
2007-2008        DOW Chemical Company Foundation Fellowship of the American-Australian Association 
2007             International Union of Pure and Applied Chemistry (IUPAC) Prize for Young Chemists. One of five awarded world-wide for the most outstanding PhD theses in the chemical sciences
2006             Royal Australian Chemical Institute (RACI) Cornforth Medal. For the most outstanding PhD thesis submitted in a branch of chemistry in Australia 
2006             JCU PhD Medal for Excellence for a Doctoral Research Thesis
2006             Winner of ‘Fresh Science 2006’ & British Council Australia UK Study Tour
2003             Don Stranks Award (one of two awarded), RACI Inorganic Division National Conference
2000             JCU University Medal
1999             G.N. Richards Medal in Chemistry. For the best overall performance and ability in undergraduate chemistry subjects
1999             Joe and Val Baker Prize for Third Year Organic Chemistry. For the highest achievement in third year Organic Chemistry
1998             H.J. Priestly Memorial Prize. For the best overall performance and ability in second year mathematics and physics subjects
1998             Royal Australian Chemical Institute (North Queensland Branch) Prize for Second Year Chemistry. For the best overall performance in second year chemistry subjects
1997             Royal Australian Chemical Institute (Queensland Branch) Prize for First Year Chemistry. For the best performance in first year chemistry subjects
1997             Faculty of Science and Engineering First Year Prize. As the most outstanding student in first year science and engineering disciplines

Select publications

References 

Living people
Year of birth missing (living people)
James Cook University alumni
Australian chemists
Academic staff of the University of Sydney
University of California, Berkeley faculty